Henan (or ;  ; alternatively Honan) is a landlocked province of China, in the central part of the country. Henan is often referred to as Zhongyuan or Zhongzhou, which literally means "central plain" or "midland", although the name is also applied to the entirety of China proper. Henan is a birthplace of Han Chinese civilization, with over 3,200 years of recorded history and remained China's cultural, economic and political center until approximately 1,000 years ago.

Henan Province is home to many heritage sites, including the ruins of Shang dynasty capital city Yin and the Shaolin Temple. Four of the Eight Great Ancient Capitals of China, Luoyang, Anyang, Kaifeng and Zhengzhou, are in Henan. The practice of tai chi also began here in Chen Jia Gou Village (Chen style), as did the later Yang and Wu styles.

Although the name of the province means "south of the [Yellow] river.", approximately a quarter of the province lies north of the Yellow River, also known as the Huang He. Its neighboring provinces are Shaanxi, Shanxi, Hebei, Shandong, Anhui, and Hubei. 

Henan is China's third-most populous province with a population of over 99 million as of 2020. Henan is also the world's seventh-most populous subnational entity, and, if it were a country by itself, Henan would be the 14th-most populous country in the world, ahead of Egypt and Vietnam.

Henan is the 5th-largest provincial economy of China, the second largest in South Central China after Guangdong, and the largest among inland provinces, with a nominal GDP of 5.88 trillion RMB (US$926 billion) as of 2021, ahead of the GDP of Turkey of 815 billion. If it were a country, it would be the 18th-largest economy as well as the 14th most populous as of 2021. However, per capita GDP is low compared to other eastern and central provinces. The economy continues to grow based on aluminum and coal prices, as well as agriculture, heavy industry, tourism and retail. High-tech industries and the service sector are concentrated around Zhengzhou and Luoyang.

History
Widely regarded as one of the cradles of Chinese civilization along with the Shanxi and Shaanxi provinces, Henan is known for its historical prosperity and periodic downturns. The economic prosperity resulted from its extensive fertile plains and its location at the heart of the country. However, its strategic location also means that it has suffered from nearly all of the major wars in China. In addition, the numerous floods of the Yellow River have caused significant damage from time to time. Kaifeng, in particular, has been buried by China's Yellow River's silt seven times due to flooding.

Ancient Era

Archaeological sites reveal that prehistoric cultures such as the Yangshao Culture and Longshan Culture were active in what is now northern Henan since the Neolithic Era. The more recent Erlitou culture has been controversially identified with the Xia dynasty, the first and largely legendary Chinese dynasty that was established, roughly, in the 21st century BC. Virtually the entire kingdom existed within what is now north and central Henan.

The Xia dynasty collapsed around the 16th century BC following the invasion of Shang, a neighboring vassal state centered around today's Shangqiu in eastern Henan. The Shang dynasty (16th–11th centuries BC) was the first literate dynasty of China. Its many capitals are located at the modern cities of Shangqiu, Yanshi, and Zhengzhou. Their last and most important capital, Yin, located in modern Anyang, is where the first Chinese writing was created.

In the 11th century BC, the Zhou dynasty of Shaanxi arrived from the west and overthrew the Shang dynasty. The capital was moved to Chang'an, and the political and economical center was moved away from Henan for the first time. In 722 BC, when Chang'an was devastated by Xionites invasions, the capital was moved back east to Luoyang. This began the Spring and Autumn period, a period of warfare and rivalry. What is now Henan and all of China was divided into a variety of small, independent states, constantly at war for control of the central plain. Although regarded formally as the ruler of China, the control that Zhou king in Luoyang exerted over the feudal kingdoms had virtually disappeared. Despite the prolonged period of instability, prominent philosophers such as Confucius emerged in this era and offered their ideas on how a state should be run. Laozi, the founder of Taoism, was born in northern Chu, part of modern-day Henan.

Later on, these states were replaced by seven large and powerful states during the Warring States period, and Henan was divided into three states, the Wei to the north, the Chu to the south, and the Han in the middle. In 221 BC, state of Qin forces from Shaanxi conquered all of the other six states, ending 800 years of warfare.

Imperial Era
Ying Zheng, the leader of Qin, crowned himself (220 BCE) as the First Emperor. He abolished the feudal system and centralized all powers, establishing the Qin dynasty and unifying the core of the Han Chinese homeland for the first time. The empire quickly collapsed after the death (210 BCE) of Ying Zheng and was replaced by the Han dynasty in 206 BC, with its capital at Chang'an. Thus, a golden age of Chinese culture, economy, and military power began. The capital moved east to Luoyang in 25 AD, in response to a coup in Chang'an that created the short-lived Xin dynasty. Luoyang quickly regained control of China, and the Eastern Han dynasty (25–220) began, extending the golden age for another two centuries.

The late Eastern Han dynasty saw war and rivalry between regional warlords. Xuchang in central Henan was the power base of Cao Cao, who eventually succeeded in unifying all of northern China under the Kingdom of Wei. Wei then moved its capital to Luoyang, which remained the capital after the unification of China by the Western Jin dynasty. During this period Luoyang became one of the largest and most prosperous cities in the world, despite being repeatedly damaged by warfare.

With the fall of the Western Jin dynasty in the 4th and 5th centuries, nomadic peoples from the north invaded northern China and established many successive regimes in northern China, including Henan. These people were gradually assimilated into the Chinese culture in a process known as sinification.

The short-lived Sui dynasty reunified China again in 589 with its capital back in Chang'an. It collapsed due to Sui Emperor Yang's costly attempt to relocate the capital from Chang'an to Luoyang and the construction of many extravagant palaces there. The succeeding Tang dynasty (618–907) kept its capital in Chang'an, marking the beginning of China's second golden age, with Henan being one of the wealthiest places in the empire.

The Tang dynasty lasted for three centuries before it eventually succumbed to internal strife. In the Period of Five Dynasties and Ten Kingdoms (907–960) that followed, Kaifeng in eastern Henan became the capital of four dynasties. The Song dynasty that reunified China in 982 also had its capital at Kaifeng. Under Song rule, China entered another era of culture and prosperity, and Kaifeng overtook Luoyang and Chang'an as the largest city in China and in the world. In 1127, however, the Song dynasty succumbed to Jurchen (Jin dynasty) invaders from the north in the Jin–Song war, and in 1142 ceded all of northern China, including Henan. The Song government moved its capital to Hangzhou in Southern China, which, under the Southern Song dynasty (1127–1279) continued to enjoy relative economic and culture prosperity. A prolonged period of peace and cultural and economic prosperity in the Yangtze River delta Jiangnan region (modern southern Jiangsu, northern Zhejiang, and Shanghai) made this the new center of Chinese culture and economy.

Kaifeng served as the Jurchen's "southern capital" from 1157 (other sources say 1161) and was reconstructed during this time. But the Jurchen kept their main capital further north, until 1214, when they were forced to move the imperial court southwards to Kaifeng in order to flee the Mongol onslaught. In 1234 they succumbed to combined Mongol and Song dynasty forces. Mongols took control, and in 1279 they conquered all of China, establishing the Yuan dynasty and set up the equivalent of modern Henan province, with borders very similar to the modern ones. Neither its territories nor its role in the economy changed under later dynasties. Henan remained important in the Ming dynasty (1368–1644) and Qing dynasty (1644–1911) that followed, though its economy slowly deteriorated due to frequent natural disasters.

Modern Era
The Qing dynasty was overthrown by the 1911 Revolution and then the Republic of China was established in 1912, during which a man from Henan, Yuan Shikai, played an important role and thus he became the first president of Republic of China. The construction and extension of the Pinghan Railway and Longhai Railway had turned Zhengzhou, a minor county town at the time, into a major transportation hub. Despite the rise of Zhengzhou, Henan's overall economy repeatedly stumbled as it was the hardest hit by the many disasters that struck China in its modern era.

Henan suffered greatly during the Second Sino-Japanese War. In 1938, when the Imperial Japanese Army captured Kaifeng, the government led by Chiang Kai-shek bombed the Huayuankou dam in Zhengzhou in order to prevent Japanese forces from advancing further. However, this caused massive flooding in Henan, Anhui, and Jiangsu resulting in hundreds of thousands of deaths. In 1942 Henan was hit by a great famine resulting from a mix of drought, locusts and destruction caused by the war. Grain requisition policies were continued by Chinese and Japanese authorities despite the shortage of food, making the death toll far greater than it might have been otherwise.

In 1954, the new government of the People's Republic of China moved the capital of Henan from Kaifeng to Zhengzhou, as a result of its economic importance. The PRC had earlier established a short-lived Pingyuan Province consisting of what is now northern Henan and western Shandong with Xinxiang as its capital. This province was abolished in 1952.

In 1958, Yashan in Suiping County, Henan, became the first people's commune of China, heralding the beginning of the "Great Leap Forward". In the subsequent famines of the early 1960s popularly attributed to the Great Leap Forward, Henan was one of the hardest hit and millions of people died. Suffering under famine and economic chaos caused by the Great Leap, locals in Henan offered low-level resistance mostly through banditry. In 1959, however, a full peasant uprising erupted and was only defeated after twenty days of fighting.

A destructive flooding of the Huai River in the summer of 1950 prompted large-scale construction of dams on its tributaries in central and southern Henan.
Unfortunately, many of the dams were not able to withstand the extraordinarily high levels of rainfall caused by Typhoon Nina in August 1975. Sixty-two dams, the largest of which was the Banqiao Dam in Biyang County collapsed; catastrophic flooding, spread over several counties throughout Zhumadian Prefecture and further downstream, killed at least 26,000 people. Unofficial human life loss estimates, including deaths from the ensuing epidemics and famine, range as high as 85,600, 171,000 or even 230 000. This is considered the most deadly dam-related disaster in human history.

By the early 1970s, China was one of the poorest countries in the world, and Henan was one of the poorest provinces in China. In 1978, however, when the communist leader Deng Xiaoping initiated the open door policy and embraced capitalism, China entered an economic boom that continues today. The boom did not reach inland provinces such as Henan initially, but by the 1990s Henan's economy was expanding at an even faster rate than that of China overall.

In November 2004, martial law was declared in Zhongmou County, Henan, to quell deadly ethnic clashes between Han Chinese and the Muslim Hui Chinese. The reported number of deaths ranged between 7 and 148.

In July 2021, high amounts of rainfall caused flooding, killing 302 and damaging amounting to 82 billion yuan.

Geography

Henan has a diverse landscape with floodplains in the east and mountains in the west. Much of the province forms part the densely populated North China Plain, an area known as the "breadbasket of China". The Taihang Mountains intrude partially into Henan's northwestern borders from Shanxi, forming the eastern edge of Loess Plateau. To the west the Xionger and Funiu Mountains form an extensive network of mountain ranges and plateaus, supporting one of the few remaining temperate deciduous forests which once covered all of Henan. The renowned Mount Song and its Shaolin Temple is located in the far east of the region, near the capital city Zhengzhou. To the far south, the Dabie Mountains divides Hubei from Henan. The Nanyang Basin, separated from North China Plain by these mountains, is another important agricultural and population center, with culture and history distinct from the rest of Henan and closer to that of Hubei's. Unlike the rest of northern China, desertification is not a problem in Henan, though sandstorms are common in cities near the Yellow River due to the large amount of sand present in the river. At 2413.8 meters above sea level, the highest point in Henan province is Laoyachanao.

The Yellow River passes through central Henan. It enters from the northwest, via the Sanmenxia Reservoir. After it passes Luoyang, the mountains gave way to plains. Excessive amount of sediments are formed due to the silt it picks up from the Loess Plateau, raising the riverbed and causing frequent floods which shaped the habitat of the region. More recently however, construction of dams and levees, as well as the depletion of water resources have ended the floods. The Huai River in southern Henan is another important river, and has been recognized as part of the boundary dividing northern and southern Chinese climate and culture.

Henan shares borders with six other provinces. It is bordered to the west by Shaanxi, to the south by Hubei, and to the north by Shanxi (northwest) and Hebei (northeast). To the east lie Shandong (northeast) and Anhui (southeast), whose borders meet at a narrow strip of land which separates Henan from Jiangsu to the east.

Climate
Henan has a temperate climate that is humid subtropical (Köppen Cwa or Cfa) to the south of the Yellow River and bordering on humid continental (Köppen Dwa) to the north. It has a distinct seasonal climate characterised by hot, humid summers due to the East Asian monsoon, and generally cool to cold, windy, dry winters that reflect the influence of the vast Siberian anticyclone. Temperatures average around the freezing mark in January and 27 to 28 °C in July. A great majority of the annual rainfall occurs during the summer.

Administrative divisions

Henan is divided into seventeen prefecture-level divisions: all prefecture-level cities; along with one directly administered county-level city (a sub-prefecture-level city):

These 17 prefecture-level cities and one directly administered county-level city of Henan are in turn subdivided into 157 county-level divisions (54 districts, 21 county-level cities, and 82 counties; the sub-prefecture-level city of Jiyuan is counted as a county-level city here). Those are in turn divided into 2454 township-level divisions (1181 towns, 598 townships, twelve ethnic townships, and 663 subdistricts).

Urban areas

Demographics 

With a population of approximately 93.6 million, Henan is the third most populous Chinese province after Guangdong and Shandong. It is also the fifth most populous sub-national division in the world. If it were a country by itself, it would be the twelfth most populous in the world, just behind Mexico and ahead of the Philippines. However, the hukou system shows Henan as the most populous province in China with over 103 million people, as it counts the migrant Henanese laborers as residents of Henan, instead of the province they currently reside in. On the other hand, Guangdong is shown as having only 81 million people, though the actual population is 95 million due to the influx of migrants from other provinces.

The population is highly homogeneous with 98.8% of the population being Han. Small populations of Mongols and Manchus exists in scattered rural communities as well as major urban centers.
Along with Jiangxi, Henan has one of the most unbalanced gender ratios in China. As a result of the Chinese government's one-child policy (many parents do not want the only child to be female and abort the fetus), the gender ratio was 118.46 males for 100 females in 2000. Subsequently, aborting fetuses due to their female sex was banned in Henan and heavy fines are issued for those who violate the law. In addition, daughter-only families receive an annual allowance from the government. Despite these efforts the problem seems to have become far worse. Based on a 2009 British Medical Journal study, the ratio is over 140 boys for every 100 girls in the 1–4 age group; this might be a strong exaggeration, as many families with more than one child do not register their daughters to the hukou in order to escape fines.

Religion

According to a 2012 survey only around 13% of the population of Henan belongs to organised religions, the largest groups being Buddhists with 6.4%, followed by Protestants with 5.6%, Muslims with 1.3% and Catholics with 0.5%. Henan has some important centres of Chinese Buddhism, the White Horse Temple and the famous Shaolin Monastery.

Henan has also the largest Christian population by numbers and percentage of any province of China, 6.1% of the province's population , corresponding to approximately 7 million Christians. A 2009 survey reported the share of Christians to be 9.33%.  In 2019, Communist officials demolished the True Jesus Church near Zhumadian city in Henan province.  In 2020, Communist officials demolished the Sunzhuang Church.

The reports didn't give figures for other types of religion; 86% of the population may be either irreligious or involved in worship of nature deities, Confucianism, Taoism and folk religious sects (for example, a sect that is endogenous to Henan is the Tianxian miaodao). According to a 2007 survey, approximately 8% of the Henanese believe in and are involved in ancestor veneration, the traditional Chinese religion of the lineages organised into lineage churches and ancestral shrines.

Politics

The Government of Henan is structured in a dual party-government system like all other governing institutions in mainland China.

The Governor of Henan is the highest-ranking official in the People's Government of Henan. However, in the province's dual party-government governing system, the Governor has less power than the Henan Chinese Communist Party Provincial Committee Secretary, colloquially termed the "Henan CCP Party Chief".

Economy

Henan has seen rapid development in its economy over the past two decades, and its economy has expanded at an even faster rate than the national average of 10%. This rapid growth has transformed Henan from one of the poorest provinces to one that matches other central provinces. 

Henan is the 5th-largest provincial economy of China, the second largest in South Central China after Guangdong, the largest in Central China and the largest among inland provinces, with a nominal GDP of 5.88 trillion RMB (US$926 billion) as of 2021, ahead of the GDP of Turkey of 815 billion. If it were a country, it would be the 18th-largest economy as well as the 14th most populous as of 2021. However, per capita GDP is low compared to other eastern and central provinces.

Henan is a semi-industrialized economy with an underdeveloped service sector. Agriculture has traditionally been a pillar of its economy, with the nation's highest wheat and sesame output and second highest rice output, earning its reputation as the breadbasket of China. Henan is also an important producer of beef, cotton, maize, pork, animal oil, and corn. 

Although Henan's industry has traditionally been based on light textiles and food processing, recent developments have diversified the industry sector to metallurgy, petrol, cement, chemical industry, machinery and electronics. Henan has the second largest molybdenum reserves in the world. Coal, aluminum, alkaline metals and tungsten are also present in large amounts in western Henan. Henan houses some of the biggest limestone reserves in China estimated over 24 billion tons. Export and processing of these materials is one of the main sources of revenues.

Henan is actively trying to build its economy around the provincial capital of Zhengzhou, and it is hoped that the province may become an important transportation and manufacturing hub in the years to come. 

In July 2021, extreme flooding inflicted an estimated US$12.7 billion of economic damage in Henan.

Transportation

Henan has some of the most advanced transportation system in China due to its flat terrain and its location at the heart of central China's construction boom. The Jingguang and Longhai Railway, the nation's two most important railways, run through much of the province and intersect at Zhengzhou. Other railway hubs such as Shangqiu, Xinxiang, and Luohe have also become important centers of trade and manufacturing as a result. A high-speed railway links Zhengzhou with Xi'an. The state of air transport is less stellar, the only 3 public airports are located in Xinzheng (near Zhengzhou), Luoyang, and Nanyang.

Culture

 Most of Henan speaks dialects of the Mandarin group of dialects spoken in northern and southwestern China. Linguists put these dialects into the category of "Zhongyuan Mandarin". The northwestern corner of Henan is an exception, where people speak Jin dialects instead. The dialects of Henan are collectively called "the Henan dialect" in popular usage, with easily identifiable stereotypical features.
Yu opera (Yuju) is the local form of Chinese opera; it is also well-known and popular across the rest of China. Henan Quju and Henan Yuediao are also important local opera forms.
Henan cuisine is the local cuisine, with traditions such as the Luoyang Shuixi (Luoyang "Water Table", consisting entirely of various soups, etc.); Xinyang Duncai (Xinyang brewed vegetables), and the traditional cuisine of Kaifeng.
Important traditional art and craft products include: Junci, a type of porcelain originating in Yuzhou noted for its unpredictable colour patterns; the jade carvings of Zhenping; and Luoyang's Tangsancai ("Tang Three Colours"), which are earthenware figurines made in the traditional style of the Tang dynasty.

Tourism
Henan is located in the Yellow River valley where ancient people lived. Intricate pottery, writing and musical instruments of the Peiligang Culture and Yangshao Culture arose during neolithic times. Three of the Seven Ancient Capitals of China are in Henan: Luoyang, Kaifeng and Anyang. 16 historical sites in Henan are protected at the national level and 267 more at the provincial level.

Baligou in Xinxiang
Gaocheng Astronomical Observatory in Dengfeng, the oldest astronomical observatory in China.
Longmen Grottoes, near Luoyang, a UNESCO World Heritage Site since 2000.
Mount Jigong, on the southern border.
Mount Mangdang in Shangqiu
Mount Song, near Dengfeng, one of the Five Sacred Mountains of China.
Shaolin Temple, on Mount Song.
Songyue Pagoda
White Horse Temple in Luoyang
Yinxu in Anyang, a UNESCO World Heritage Site.
Youguo Temple with the Iron Pagoda
Yuntai Mountain in Jiaozuo

Colleges and universities

Anyang Institute of Technology
Henan Agricultural University
Henan College of Traditional Chinese Medicine
Henan Medical University
Henan Normal University
Henan Polytechnic University
Henan University of Economics and Law
Henan University of Science and Technology
Henan University of Technology
Henan University
Huanghe Science and Technology University
Luoyang Institute of Technology
Nanyang Institute of Technology
Nanyang Teachers College
North China University of Water Resources and Electric Power
Pingdingshan Normal College
Shangqiu College
Shangqiu Normal College
Sias University
Xinxiang College
Xinxiang Medical University
Zhengzhou Grain College
Zhengzhou Institute of Aeronautical Industry Management
Zhengzhou Textile Institute
Zhengzhou University of Light Industry
Zhengzhou University of Technology
Zhengzhou University
Zhongyuan Institute of Technology

Notable individuals

Chen Sheng, (known in some sources as Chen She) and Wu Guang (both died 209 BC or 208 BC), leaders of the first rebellion against Qin dynasty
Chen Zhong, Olympic gold medalist in Taekwondo
Cheng Hao (1032–1085) and brother Cheng Yi (1033–1107), Neo-Confucian philosophers
Deng Ai (?−264), an officer of Cao Wei during the Three Kingdoms period
Deng Yaping (born 5 February 1973), four-time Olympic gold medalist.
Du Fu (712–770), considered one of the greatest of Chinese poets
Du Wei (born 9 February 1982), professional football player
Fan Zhen (c. 450–515), a Chinese philosopher of the Southern Qi dynasty, remembered today for the treatise Shen Mie Lun (On the Annihilation of the Soul)
Feng Yi, a general of the Eastern Han dynasty
Feng Youlan (1895–1990), philosopher
Gao Yaojie, medical doctor
Ge Xin'ai (born 30 June 1953) Table Tennis World Champion (1975, 1977, 1979)
Han Fei (c. 280–233 BC), Legalist philosopher
Han Yu (768–824), one of China's best known prose writers and poets
Hui Shi (380 BC−?), philosopher
Jia Aoqi, sanshou fighter and professional kickboxer
Jia Yi, a Chinese poet and statesman of the Han dynasty
Kong Hongxing, sanshou fighter
Lao Zi (Lao Tzu: dates uncertain), founder of Daoism
Li Shangyin (813–858), poet
Li Tang (c. 1080−c. 1130), painter
Liang Jun (born 1945), teacher and women's rights activist
Lie Yukou (c. 4th century BC), Daoist philosopher
Liu Guoliang, member of the Chinese table tennis team
Mo Zi, founder of Mohism
Ruan Ji (210–263), poet
Sima Yi (179–251), a general, military strategist, and politician of Cao Wei during the Three Kingdoms period
Su Qin
Shang Tang, the first ruling king of the Shang dynasty
Wei Rui, sanshou fighter and professional kickboxer
Xu Shen (c.58−c. 147), editor of the Shuowen Jiezi
Xu Shu one of Liu Bei's advisors during the Three Kingdoms period of China.
Xun You an advisor to Cao Cao during the Three Kingdoms period
Xun Yu (styled-named Wenruo), an advisor to Cao Cao during the Three Kingdoms period
Yuan Shikai (1859–1916), second President of the Republic of China
Yuan Shizhong, (died 1643), rebel leader
Yue Fei (1103–1142), a noted Chinese patriot and general who fought for the Southern Song dynasty against the Jurchen
Zhang Heng, an astronomer, mathematician, inventor, geographer, artist, poet, statesman, and literary scholar of the Eastern Han dynasty
Zhang Jian (born September 1955), judge
Zhang Zhilei, professional heavyweight boxer
Zhang Ji (style-named Zhang Zhongjing) (150–219), an Eastern Han physician, the author of the Shanghan Zabing Lun
Zhao Ziyang (17 October 1919 − 17 January 2005), former Premier and CCP Secretary
Zhong You (151–230), a politician and calligrapher in Wei dynasty of San guo
Zhu Ting, sixteenth captain of China National Women's Volleyball Team
Chuang Tzu (born 369 BC), Daoist philosopher

Sports teams 
Professional sports teams in Henan include;
Chinese Basketball Association
Henan Dragons
Chinese Football Association Jia League
Henan Jianye F.C.

See also

 List of Major National Historical and Cultural Sites in Henan
 Zhengzhou

References

Citations

Works cited 
 
 
 Economic profile for Henan at HKTDC

External links

 Henan Government website 

 
Central China
Provinces of the People's Republic of China